Diiodotyrosine (DIT) is a precursor in the production of thyroid hormone, and results from iodization of monoiodotyrosine at the other meta- position on the phenol ring.

Function
DIT is a modulator of the enzyme thyroid peroxidase (which is involved in the production of thyroid hormones).

Triiodothyronine is formed, when diiodotyrosine is combined with monoiodotyrosine (in the colloid of the thyroid follicle).

Two molecules of DIT combine to make the thyroid hormone thyroxine ('T4' and 'T3').

See also
 Diiodotyrosine transaminase

References

External links
 

Iodinated tyrosine derivatives